Jach'a Apachita (Aymara jach'a big, apachita the place of transit of an important pass in the principal routes of the Andes; name in the Andes for a stone cairn, a little pile of rocks built along the trail in the high mountains, also spelled Jachcha Apacheta) is a mountain in the Andes of Bolivia which reaches a height of approximately . It is located in the Oruro Department, Sajama Province, in the southeast of the Curahuara de Carangas Municipality.

References 

Mountains of Oruro Department